Maya Kaathryn Bohnhoff (born 1954) is an American sci-fi and fantasy author.

Personal life
Bohnhoff, mother of three, has been married since 1981 to Jeff Bohnhoff. The couple and their children are members of the Baháʼí Faith. She began her interest in science fiction after watching The Day the Earth Stood Still as a child. Her mother was a singer and music was a predominant passion over writing, through her high school and college days.

Over a decade after her high school experience of being pressured to choose between practical subjects and the arts of music and writing, Bohnhoff wrote an autobiographical essay "But My Mother Was a Singer" in which she chronicles her struggle with the question and argues that though the Baháʼí teachings include an emphasis on the importance of the arts and earning a livelihood by one's calling, "… using our cultural criteria, the arts may seem to have little to do with survival. But they have a tremendous amount to do with  'carrying forward an ever advancing civilization."  Eventually she held a day job as an Instructional Designer and Manager for Kelly Services for some years but bosses would either "urge me to give up music" or told her "You don't belong here" while co-workers would misunderstand the life of the artist — "'If you are any good, what are you doing working here?'" "Minor setbacks", Bohnhoff continues, "in my 'career' provided intensely embarrassing situations at work."

On the musical side the drive to do music "…took me through years of food stamps and rice cakes, the disappointment and frustration of losing band members and starting over…" as well as taking her through "… the inertia when playing 'wall paper' music …[and] the 'top 40' club act". Along with such struggles is the spiritual one of purity of motive — "I, too, love applause, and to me the act of sharing music is more rewarding than writing it" and which genre of music was spiritual? She writes that at one point, eight months pregnant, she had an opportunity to work at Fantasy Studios in Berkeley for "fifteen hour days" but learned that "…I was a musician and a writer by natural inclination, not a celebrity" and "found a deeper understanding of Baháʼu'lláh's admonition to be independent of all save God." She resolves the conflict noting "Any musician who has heard a song come to life out of the weave of rhythm and melody, any writer who has ever created a set of characters, any painter who has laid brush to canvas, any sculptor who has ever been up to his elbows in clay or marble dust, any woman who has ever given birth to a child, any and all have experienced something central to understanding the love that motivated the First Creator." Bohnhoff writes using an Apple Inc. PowerBook.

Bohnhoff is now a full-time writer, working alone and in collaboration with Michael Reaves.

Writing

Short writings
Bohnhoff has written several dozen short stories and novelettes in most of the well known publishing magazines: Analog magazine, Interzone (magazine), Amazing Stories, Realms of Fantasy, Jim Baen's Universe, and others. Many of them have a recognizable relationship to religions — several have a significant basis in relation to the Baháʼí Faith and a few use Pagan (Spirit Gate), Catholic (Infinite Space, Infinite God), and Muslim (The Sons of the Fathers) characters or situations.  Two brief examples include "Home is Where..." in which a pair of time traveling historians from the future employ an unusual conflict resolution method when their homesick kids go on strike during a Cold War visit to a US Air Force Base, and "The White Dog" wherein a lady comes to terms with her shocking albino appearance through the allegorical totem used by ʻAbdu'l-Bahá — a little white dog. The story "The White Dog" was a finalist for the 1999 BSFA award. "Cruel and Unusual Punishment" was included in the E-book anthology Infinite Sky, Infinite God which won the 2007 EPPIE award. The story "O, Pioneer" was a finalist for the 2006 Sidewise Award for Alternate History.

Long writings
In addition to her shorter works Bohnhoff has written several full-length novels which elaborate on her interests in examining/promoting feminist and religious concepts in science fiction, fantasy and related genres. Her best known novel may be The Meri which became a trilogy and has been published twice (1992 and 2005) and was a finalist for Locus magazine's 1993 award for Best First Novel Bohnhoff has worked with internet development of online content with her editorship of Hackoff.com — a blook by Tom Evslin. In 2018 Pegasus Books published The Antiquities Hunter: A Gina Miyoko Mystery, the first in a series of private detective novels.

Feminist and religious themes
The Meri series revolves around the period of transition among the people who live on a peninsula. The chapters are headed with quotes from scripture presented as those of the religion of the people but many are in fact quotes from Baháʼí scripture, the Bhagavad Gita, the Upanishads, the Dhammapada and other Buddhist sacred texts, the Qurʼan and the Bible. The first and second book also carry an acknowledgement of Baháʼu'lláh, a Local Spiritual Assembly and Baháʼí community.  The plot involves a progression on the understanding of a people in relation to the role and position of women. Unknown to the people of the story, women have always been instrumental to their religion as agents of God and a chosen few have always acted as the personification of the Spirit of God, or "Meri".  The first book focuses on a young girl destined to take on that role. While similar to other stories of the triumph of women it has several unique qualities most particularly a central male character being her benefactor and teacher and not an obstacle she has to overcome. The second book focuses on the return of the prior "Meri" who takes it as her mission as the head of the renewed religion to promulgate the new paradigm of the role of women. The third book focuses on her transition to being a head of state but wrestling with several of the same issues from among as well as beyond her people. Another novel she has written called The Spirit Gate has many of the same features but is written in a different context — a fantasy work set in a historical time and place of roughly AD 1000 in the area today of Poland and Ukraine where two forms of Christianity (Eastern Orthodox and Catholic) and Islam met the pagan older religion. Baháʼí themes, especially in the respect granted other religions, are largely identified with the older religion. Several of these themes are also in Bohnhoff's shorter writings — "Infinite Sky, Infinite God" highlights a Catholic future. Several short stories center on women — like "The Doctor's Wife" and "The White Dog" and both have reference to a religion. Reprints of some of Bohnhoff's works containing references to Baha'i themes are collected in the Juxta Press release, _I Loved Thy Creation_.

Professional advancement
Bohnhoff has worked in a number of venues to contribute to the field of authorship and relevance of Science Fiction and Fantasy at SciFi/Fa Conventions. She has participated in and moderated panel discussions for over a decade. She participates in the Museitup online writers conference and the Catholic Writers' Conference, and is a founding member and regular blogger at the Book View Café, a fiction website created by a cooperative of over 20 professional genre writers as an alternative publishing venture.

 "Different Types of Writing"
 "Turning Mental Blocks into Building Blocks",
 "Is SF Relevant Any More? Was It Ever?",
  "Mythic roots of fantasy"
 "Coping with and/or embracing change"
 "The Rise and Fall of Civilization"
 "Historical Fiction: Call it fantasy, and they'll buy it. Will readers--and thus editors--only buy historical fiction when you add magic and fairies?"
 "Science and Religion: Harmony or Discord"
 "Cardinal Richelieu revisited - the good and evil priest in literature"
 "Research for alternate history. Sources to use so good history can make good fiction"
 "Is it now chic to be geek - Is this the age of the geek?" 
 "Asian-themed fantasy, urban fantasy, maybe even Roman fantasy?"
  "Disenchantment - Fantasy novelists portrayals of Christian and Christian-like faiths..."
  "Evolution - Science vs. Religion why do they disagree? And if people can re-engineer themselves where does that leave God?"
  "The Art & Craft of Writing"
  "Plot, Settings, and Characters"
 "Tolkien vs Jackson"
 "Show me  - Don't tell me"
 "How to Write the BEST First Line"
 "The Wiccan Culture: An Introduction"
 "The Short Story as an Art Form"
 "Getting Your Writing to Grow Up"

Bohnhoff has also contributed to professional writing magazines and online presentations.

Bibliography

 
 "A Little Bit of an Eclipse" (Analog, 1990)
 "Blythe Magic" (Analog, 1990)
 "Heroes" (Analog, 1990)
 "Shaman" (Analog, 1990)
 "Hobbits" (Analog, 1991 / Hobbits, Halflings, Warrows & Wee Folkd, Questar 1993)
 "Home Is Where..." (Analog, 1991)
 "If It Ain't Broke..." (Analog, 1991)
 "The Devil His Due" (Amazing Stories, 1991)
 "The Doctor's Wife" (Analog, 1992)
 THE MERI (Baen, 1992, Sense of Wonder Press, James A. Rock & Co., Pub. 2005) (first of The Meri trilogy) 
 "An End to Writer's Block" (Writer's Digest, 1992)
 "A Tear in the Mind's Eye" (Analog, 1993)
 "Squatter's Rights" (Analog, 1993)
 "Taco Del and the Fabled Tree of Destiny" (Amazing Stories, 1993)
 TAMINY (Baen, 1993) (second of The Meri trilogy) 
 "The Boy Who Loved Clouds" (Amazing Stories, 1993)
 "As the Angels in Heaven" (Analog, 1995)
 THE CRYSTAL ROSE (Baen, 1995) (third of The Meri trilogy) 
 "The Secret Life of Gods" (Analog, 1995)
 "The Sons of the Fathers" (Century, 1995)
 "Marsh Mallow" (Analog, 1996)
 THE SPIRIT GATE (Baen, 1996)
 "Ask Arlen" (Analog, 1997)
 "Content with the Mysterious" (Analog, 1997)
 "Doctor Dodge" (Interzone, 1997)
 "Pipe Dreams" (Analog, 1997)
 "Dialogue and Characterization" (The Writer, 1997, The Writer's Handbook, 1998)
 "Beggars Might Ride" (Interzone, 1998)
 "Silver Lining" (Interzone, 1998)
 "Who Have No Eyes" (Interzone, 1998)
 "White Dog" (Interzone, 1999)
 "Taming the Fictional Wilds" (Fiction Writer Magazine, 1999)
 "Any Mother's Son" (Analog, 2000)
 "A Hole in Her Head" (Realms of Fantasy, 2001)
 "Cruel and Unusual Punishment" (Interzone, 2002, and Infinite Sky, Infinite God. anthology, 2006) (2007 winner of the EPPIE award)
 MAGIC TIME: ANGELFIRE (with Marc Zicree) ( Eos, 2002) 
 "Distance" (Analog, 2003)
 "O, Pioneer" (Paradox, 2005)
 "Dabbling in Magic" (Speculations, 2005)
 Hackoff.com a blook (Bohnhoff was the editor) by Tom Evslin.
 "Willies" (Analog, 2006)
 "The Nature of Things" (Jim Baen's Universe, 2006)
 MR. TWILIGHT - (with Michael Reaves) (Del Rey, 2006)
 BATMAN: FEAR ITSELF (Batman Novel with Michael Reaves) (Del Rey and DC Comics, 2007)
 "Junkie" Analog 128/7&8 (Jul/Aug 2008) : 134–143
 "The Resident" (Jim Baen's Universe, Summer 2009)
 STAR WARS: CORUSCANT NIGHTS III—PATTERNS OF FORCE — (with Michael Reaves) (Del Rey/Lucasbooks, 2009) New York Times Bestseller at #16
 LALDASA: Beloved Slave (Book View Press, 2009)
 TACO DEL and the FABLED TREE OF DESTINY (Book View Press, 2010)
 A PRINCESS OF PASSYUNK Book View Press, 2010)
 "Simple Gifts" Analog (Jan/Feb 2010)
 STAR WARS: SHADOW GAMES (with Michael Reaves) (Del Rey/Lucasbooks, 2011) New York Times Bestseller at #25
 SHAMAN (a collection of science fiction short stories from Analog magazine, Book View Press, 2012)
 STAR WARS: THE LAST JEDI (with Michael Reaves) (Del Rey/Lucasbooks, 2013) New York Times Bestseller at #11
The Antiquities: A Gina Miyoko Mystery (Pegasus Books, 2018)

Much of the short fiction listed above is available for reading at the Book View Café.

Music
Though Bohnhoff's interest in music as a career stretches back to her high school years and her mother, her avocation as a musician was started by 1980 when she was a member of a band called "Talisman" playing a mix of original progressive rock and top 40 and got some airtime on KZAP, a radio station in Sacramento, California. The Bonhoffs later reformed as part the band "Syntax" through which they released a cassette tape "Silent Planet" in 1990 — "Syntax" using a substantial amount of MIDI based music. They were introduced to filk music in 1991 and predominantly use acoustic guitars in their live shows. In 1991 the Bohnhoffs had been invited to a science fiction convention for Maya's "Hand-me Down Town" publication in Analog magazine because Maya was up for the Nebula Award. At a party for the event Jeff had the opportunity to a jam session with founding filk musicians Dr. Jane Robinson, Cynthia McQuillin and Elizabeth Ann Scarborough. After other conventions mostly for Maya's writing, Jeff and Maya were spontaneously invited to play music at the 1995 Baycon by Kathy Mar. It was after a long evening of music that they wrote "Knights in White Satin". Filk and parody have become their main musical presence, though now they perform through their own production company, MysticFig and as a duo predominantly.

Mrs. and Mr. Bohnhoff have given concerts at various science fiction conventions and conference for many years and have won awards doing so. They have attended conventions Norwescon, Worldcon, LepreCon, Consonance, OryCon, the Ohio Valley Filk Fest and others. They have produced a quartet of CDs through their own production company. They also play often at the local Baháʼí events and Centers. Maya also participated in a panel discussion "Intro to Filk - Who are those people sing weird songs?" at the 1997 OryCon and "Steal That Tune - Filkers have borrowed tunes from folk sources, rock singers, Broadway shows, you name it. And not all of the results are parodies...." with her husband and others.

Releases
 Silent Planet (1990) (cassette) (as part of the band "Syntax")
 Retro Rocket Science (2001)
 Manhattan Sleeps (2002)
 Aliens Ate My Homework (2003) (Bohnhoffs' song Knights in White Satin won the 2003 Pegasus Awards for Best Writer/Composer, the Cat Faber Best Parody,  by the Ohio Valley Filk Fest concom.
 Harmony Heifers (2005) (and won the 2005 Pegasus Award for Best Performers)
 Möbius Street (2009) (with guest musicians including bassists Tony Levin (Peter Gabriel) and Victor Gonzalez (Santana), vocalist Michelle (Vixy) Dockrey, saxophonist Chris French, and keyboardist Mich Sampson (Playing Rapunzel).
 Grated Hits (2010) (with guest musicians including Kristoph Klover and Margaret Davis (Avalon Rising), Vixy Dockrey, Tony Fabris, Alex Bohnhoff, Kristine Bohnhoff, Chris Dickenson, Mary Crowell)
 I Remember The Rain (2016)
 Schrödinger's Hairball (2018)

See also
Baháʼí Faith in fiction
Christian science fiction
Filk

References

External links

 Official Webpage

 Author page at Baens-Universe Publishers
 Author page at Authorsden
 Feministsf Wiki Entry

20th-century American novelists
21st-century American novelists
American science fiction writers
American fantasy writers
American women novelists
1954 births
Living people
American Bahá'ís
Filkers
20th-century Bahá'ís
21st-century Bahá'ís
Writers from California
Writers from Nebraska
Women science fiction and fantasy writers
20th-century American women writers
21st-century American women writers
American feminist writers
Baháʼí feminists